The Andean big-eared mouse (Auliscomys sublimis) is a species of rodent in the family Cricetidae. It is found in Argentina, Bolivia, Chile, and Peru.

References

 Baillie, J. 1996.  Auliscomys sublimis.   2006 IUCN Red List of Threatened Species.   Downloaded on 9 July 2007.
Musser, G. G. and M. D. Carleton. 2005. Superfamily Muroidea. pp. 894–1531 in Mammal Species of the World a Taxonomic and Geographic Reference. D. E. Wilson and D. M. Reeder eds. Johns Hopkins University Press, Baltimore.

Mammals of Argentina
Mammals of Bolivia
Mammals of Chile
Mammals of Peru
Auliscomys
Mammals described in 1900
Taxa named by Oldfield Thomas
Taxonomy articles created by Polbot